The Superannuation Complaints Tribunal is an independent statutory body established by the Australian Government to deal with complaints about superannuation (and certain life insurance annuities).

History

The Superannuation Complaints Tribunal was established under the Superannuation (Resolution of Complaints) Act in 1993.  It was established at the same time as a new prudential and disclosure framework was put in place under the Superannuation Industry (Supervision) Act 1993, protecting employees compulsory superannuation contributions (introduced in 1992).

Operation of the Tribunal

In order for the Tribunal to deal with a complaint, a member (former member or potential beneficiary) of a superannuation fund must first make a formal complaint to the Trustee of that fund (under the fund's own internal complaints procedures).  If the complaint is not resolved to the member's satisfaction (or has not been dealt with within a 90-day period) then a complaint can be made to the Tribunal.

The Tribunal will only deal with complaints as they relate to a trustee decision affecting an individual member. The Tribunal cannot deal with complaints about the fund as a whole (e.g. poor investment performance). 

The Tribunal will first try and resolve the complaint through conciliation (where the SCT will facilitate a discussion with all parties involved).

If conciliation is not successful, the Tribunal will make a "review" decision that is binding on all parties.

From 1 July 2018, the Australian Financial Complaints Authority (AFCA) will replace the Financial Ombudsman Service (FOS), the Superannuation Complaints Tribunal (SCT) and the Credit and Investments Ombudsman.

See also
Superannuation in Australia
Australian Prudential Regulation Authority
Australian Securities and Investments Commission
Ombudsmen in Australia
Financial Ombudsman Service (Australia)

References
  "You can complain" by Australian Securities and Investments Commission, June, 2006, retrieved 29 December 2006
  "Review of the Superannuation Complaints Tribunal" by the Senate Select Committee on Superannuation, April 1996

External links
 Superannaution Complaints Tribunal Website http://www.sct.gov.au/
 ASIC Consumer Website "MoneySmart" http://www.moneysmart.gov.au

Commonwealth Government agencies of Australia
Ombudsmen in Australia
Dispute resolution
Superannuation in Australia
Financial regulatory authorities of Australia
1993 establishments in Australia
2018 disestablishments in Australia
Courts and tribunals established in 1993
Courts and tribunals disestablished in 2018